Eduardo Almeida Pinheiro (born 8 November 1997) simply Edu Pinheiro, is a Portuguese footballer who plays for Sporting CP B as a midfielder.

Football career
On 3 April 2016, Pinheiro made his professional debut with Paços Ferreira in a 2015–16 Primeira Liga match against Estoril Praia.

References

External links

Stats and profile at LPFP 

1997 births
People from São João da Madeira
Living people
Portuguese footballers
Association football midfielders
Primeira Liga players
F.C. Paços de Ferreira players
Sporting CP B players
S.U. Sintrense players
S.C. Olhanense players
Liga Portugal 2 players
Sportspeople from Aveiro District